Hugh Walker (1855–1939) was a British university educator.

Life 

He was born in Kilbirnie, Scotland, on 7 January 1855. He attended Glasgow High School and then Glasgow University.  At university he was awarded their medal in logic and moral philosophy, and achieved his MA. Walker then went on to study at Balliol College, Oxford, as Snell Exhibitioner, graduating with first class honours in Literary Humanities in 1883. He would go on to receive an Honorary LLD from Glasgow and an Honorary DLitt from the University of Wales.

In 1884, Walker was appointed Lecturer in English and Philosophy at St David's College, Lampeter (now the University of Wales, Trinity Saint David). In 1890, he was made Professor in these same subjects. Whilst at Lampeter, he regularly contributed to the college magazine. He loved the town and college dearly. He was mayor from 1900 to 1902, and the Vice-Principal's house on campus became affectionately known as 'Walker's House'. A Hall of Residence is also named after Walker.

Walker published widely. His works include various books on English literature, along with frequent contributions to journals such as the Yale Review, Hibbert Journal and Chambers' Journal. He contributed to Cambridge Modern History and Cambridge History of English Literature.

Walker was married to Janie (nee Roxburgh).  The couple had three daughters.

Walker was given the opportunity to retire in 1930, but refused this. He died on 28 June 1939, still a member of staff at Lampeter.

Bibliography 

This list may be incomplete

 Three Centuries of Scottish Literature, Glasgow, 1893
 The Greater Victorian Poets, London, 1895
 The Age of Tennyson, London, 1897
John B. Leicester Warren, Lord de Tabley: a biographical sketch. London, 1903
 The Literature of the Victorian Era, Cambridge, 1910
 The English Essay and Essayists, London, 1915
 The English Satire and Satirists, 1925

References

External links
 
 

1855 births
1939 deaths
Academics of the University of Wales, Lampeter
People educated at the High School of Glasgow